François Hanriot (2 December 1759 – 28 July 1794) was a French Sans-culotte leader, street orator, and commander of the Garde Nationale during the French Revolution. He played a vital role in the Insurrection of 31 May – 2 June 1793 and subsequently the fall of the Girondins. On 27 July 1794 he tried to release Maximilien Robespierre, who was arrested by the Convention. He was executed on the next daytogether with Robespierre, Saint-Just and Couthonby the rules of the law of 22 Prairial, only verifying his identity at the trial.

Life

Early years
François Hanriot was born in Nanterre, now a western suburb of Paris. His parents were servants (gardeners) to a former Treasurer of France, and came from Sormery in the Bourgogne. Between 1779 and 1783 he supposedly was a soldier in America serving under Lafayette, but there are no documents to prove that.

Not a man of any specific profession, Hanriot held a variety of different jobs.  He took his first employment with a procureur doing mostly secretarial work but lost his position due to dishonesty. Next, he obtained a clerkship in the Paris octroi in 1789, doing tax work.  His position there was also ill-fated; he was dismissed after leaving his station on the night of 12 July 1789, when the popular Jacques Necker was fired, and angry Parisians attempted to burn down the building belonging to the Wall of the Ferme générale. Hanriot was arrested and imprisoned in Bicêtre and released the next year with the help of Jean-Paul Marat. After his string of unfortunate professions, Hanriot remained unemployed and subsequently very poor. His next string of occupations is rather hazy in history; many people of the time connect him to a variety of professions including shopkeeper, liquor-seller, and peddler. He lived near the Jardin des Plantes at 21, Rue de la Clef.

Role in the first years of the Revolution
After generating a more substantial fortune he moved around the corner to Rue du Battoir, now Rue de Quatrefages. In January 1792, Hanriot became well known for his anti-aristocratic outlook and for attacking Lafayette. He became an orator for the local section sans-culottes, one of the most populous and poorest districts of the capital. On 9 August 1792, when the Assembly refused to impeach Lafayette, the tocsin called the sections into arms. In the evening the "commissionaires" of several sections (Billaud-Varenne, Chaumette, Hébert, Hanriot, Fleuriot-Lescot, Pache, Bourdon) gathered in the town hall. The next day the Tuileries was stormed by the National Guard, the Fédérés and the people from the revolutionary sections of Paris.

As a member of the Cordeliers club he was strongly in favor of imposing taxes on the aristocracy, presenting them "with a bill in one hand and a pistol in the other."  With this attitude he gained a loyal following of local sans-culottes and they would appoint him on 2 September as captain of the National Guard battalion of his section. It is unlikely he participated in the September Massacre as the Sainte-Pélagie Prison in his section was not visited at all. The next evening he was present at Bicêtre with his battalion. According to Cassignac his men were involved in the massacre.

The Fall of the Girondists

The Spring of 1793 was a period of great political tension in Paris as the radical voices in the Commune and the Montagnards in the Convention became more overtly hostile to the ruling Girondist faction. The authorities' decision to arrest Jean-Paul Marat in April brought matters to a head and precipitated the fall of the Girondins in which Hanriot played a major part. In the evening of 30 May 1793 the Commune appointed Hanriot provisionally to the position of "Commandant-General" of the Parisian National Guard, because Santerre was fighting in the Vendée. He was ordered to march his troops to the Palais National. The purpose of this move was to force the Convention to dissolve the Commission of Twelve and the arrest of 22 select Girondists. Some people on the galleries called "A la Vendée". 

During the night of 30-31 May, the city gates were closed and at 3 the tocsin (in the Notre-Dame) was rung. Hanriot ordered to fire a cannon on the Pont-Neuf as a sign of alarm without permission of the Convention. Vergniaud suggested to arrest Hanriot. (Robespierre attacked Vergniaud and denounced the commission of Twelve.) In the evening of 1 June the Comité Insurrectionnel ordered the arrest 27 Girondins, of Jean-Marie Roland, Lebrun-Tondu and Clavière and banning the Girondist newspapers and the arrest of their editors. It ordered François Hanriot, to surround the Convention ‘with a respectable armed force’. 

The Convention (about 100 deputies) decided to allow men to carry arms on days of crisis and pay them for each day and promised to indemnify the workers for the interruption in the past four days. It postponed any other decisions on the accused deputies for three days. On Saturday 1 June the Commune gathered almost all day and was devoted to the preparation of a "great movement". In the evening 40,000 men surrounded the building to force the arrest. Hanriot's first care was to seize the key positions—the Arsenal, the Place Royale, and the Pont Neuf. Next, the barriers were closed and prominent suspects arrested. (At midnight the commune decided the men should take a rest and go home.) The next morning the Convention invited Hanriot, who told them all the men were prepared and posts occupied.

Hanriot ordered National Guard to march from the town hall to the National Palace. In the early evening on 2 June, a large force of armed citizens, some estimated 80,000, but Danton spoke of 30,000 souls, surrounded the convention with 63 pieces of artillery. "The armed force", Hanriot said, "will retire only when the Convention has delivered to the people the deputies denounced by the Commune." Attempting to exit, the accused Girondins walked around the palace in a theatrical procession. Confronted on all sides by bayonets and pikes, they returned to the meeting hall and submitted to the inevitable. Twenty-two Girondins were seized one by one after some juggling with names. They finally decided that 31 deputies were not to be imprisoned, but only subject to house arrest. 

On 2 June 1793 at 11 in the morning, women gathered in front of the Convention. Then Hanriot's troops surrounded the Convention with thousands of armed volunteers, cannons, and pikes while it was in session, and throngs of sans-culotte soldiers entered the building and disrupted the sessions. The President of the Convention, Herault de Sechelles, came out to appeal to Hanriot to remove his troops, but he refused. Under that pressure, the Convention voted the arrest of 22 Girondist deputies, removing that faction from power. Marat and Couthon regarded Hanriot as the "Savior of the Fatherland". (Gérard Walter insists on the contrary on the perfect discipline of the men commanded by Hanriot. The historian thus attributes to the sans-culotte commander the merit of having avoided the bloodshed during the exclusion and the arrest of the Girondins deputies.) On 11 June Hanriot resigned his command, declaring that order had been restored.  On 29 June he was reelected in his section. On 1 July he was elected by the Commune and two days later appointed by Jean Bouchotte permanent commander of the armed forces of Paris. 

On 4 September, the sans-culottes again invaded the convention. Supported by Hanriot they demanded tougher measures against rising prices and the setting up of a system of terror to root out the counter-revolution. On 11 September the power of the Committee of Public Safety was extended for one month; Robespierre supported Hanriot in the Jacobin club who led the insurrection in 2 June. On 19 September the Convention supported his appointment as general of the Parisian National Guard (in the meantime 130.000 men). Hanriot moved into an apartment on the third floor of the Hôtel de Ville, Paris,  with busts of Brutus, Marat and Rousseau. He hires seats in Théâtre de la République and Opera-Comique. On 8 December he declared not to use arms against the people; he would use reason.

End of the Reign of Terror

During the Spring of 1794, there were increasing tensions between Robespierre and the Committees on the one hand, and the Paris Commune and the sans-culottes on the other. On 6 March Hanriot appeared in front of the Convention with 1,200 men. This culminated in the arrest of Hebert, Momoro, Vincent, Ronsin and their associates on 13 March. Hanriot, a Hébertist, was protected by Robespierre. On 27 March the sans-culotte Revolutionary Army was disbanded and its artillery units brought under Hanriot's control. Although he was broadly supportive of the radical ideas of Hébert and his associates, Hanriot remained loyal to Robespierre. On 2 April 1794 - the first day of the interrogation of Danton -  he was informed not to arrest the president and the public prosecutor of Revolutionary Tribunal. 

Hanriot opposed Lazare Carnot who stripped Paris of its gunners. Hanriot managed to prevent the queues in front of the butchers and bakeries from turning into a riot. On 5 June François Hanriot ordered to detain every baker in Paris who sold his bread to people without (distribution) cards or from other sections.

On 27 July 1794 a group of Convention members organised the overthrow of Robespierre and his allies in what was known as the Thermidorean Reaction. Laurent Lecointre was the instigator of the coup, assisted by Barère, Fréron, Barras, Tallien, Thuriot, Courtois, Rovère, Garnier de l’Aube and Guffroy. Each one of them prepared his part in the attack. They decided that Hanriot, his aides-de-camp, Lavalette and Boulanger, the public prosecutor Dumas, the family Duplay and the printer Charles-Léopold Nicolas had to be arrested first, so Robespierre would be without support. 

At around 3 p.m. Hanriot was ordered to appear in the convention; he or someone else suggested to only show up accompanied by a crowd.   (Dumas was already arrested at noon  and at four taken to Sainte-Pélagie Prison, as well as members of the family Duplay.)  On horseback, Hanriot warned the sections that there would be an attempt to murder Robespierre and mobilized 2,400 National Guards in front of the town hall. What had happened was not very clear to their officers;  either the convention was closed down or the Paris Commune. Nobody explained anything. 

When the Paris Commune heard of the arrests it began mobilising forces to free Robespierre and his allies and to take control of the Convention.  The mayor Fleuriot-Lescot instructed the prisons of Paris to refuse admission to any prisoners sent to them by the Convention and Hanriot took charge of military preparations for closing the Convention.   

When he appeared at the Place du Carrousel in front of the Convention he was taken prisoner by the oldest deputy Philippe Rühl. (He seems to be taken prisoner earlier that day by :fr:Louis Antoine Joseph Robin near the Palais-Royal.)  To avoid communication with Hanriot the five deputies were given a meal and it was decided they had to leave the Tuileries? According to Eric Hazan: "Now came the turning-point of this journée: instead of taking advantage of its superiority, in both guns and men, to invade the nearby hall where the Convention was sitting, the column, lacking orders or leaders, returned to the Maison-Commune."   According to Bertrand Barère Hanriot fled to the town hall after being threatened by some deputies he could be regarded as an outlaw. The Convention did not gather before nine. 
The Convention declared the five deputies (plus the supporting members)  to be outlaws. On hearing this, the insurgents and their commander were seized with fright and fled helter-skelter to the Commune. When the Paris' militants heard this news, order began to break down, they became divided. 

In the evening Robespierre, Hanriot, and the other liberated prisoners had gathered at the Hotel de Ville which was now their headquarters.  The Convention responded by declaring them outlaws to be taken dead or alive, and ordering troops of its own under Barras to suppress them. Henriot ordered to light the entire square with torches.  Within an hour, the forces of the Commune quietly deserted the square. Around two in the morning, troops of the Convention under the command of Barras arrived. Robespierre and a number of others were arrested.  Hanriot fell from a side window, and was found later in the day, unconscious, in a neighbouring courtyard. Hanriot was taken to the guillotine in the same cart as Robespierre and his brother and was executed just before Robespierre on 28 July 1794, only semi-conscious when led to the platform.
 
According to Merda Hanriot tried to escape by a concealed staircase to the third floor. He lodged in an apartment there. Most sources say that Hanriot was thrown out of a window by Coffinhal after being accused of the disaster. (According to Ernest Hamel it is one of the many legends spread by Barère.) Anyhow, Hanriot landed in a small courtyard on a heap of glass.  He had strength enough to crawl into a drain where he was found twelve hours later and taken to the Conciergerie.

In the afternoon of 10 Thermidor (28 July, a décadi, a day of rest and festivity) the Revolutionary Tribunal condemned Robespierre and 21 "Robespierrists" (c.q. 13 members of the insurrectionary Commune) to death by the rules of the law of 22 Prairial, only verifying their identity at the trial. In the late afternoon, the convicts were taken in three carts to the Place de la Révolution to be executed. He owned 47 prints of different events during the revolution, a "magnifique" wooden secretary, and the complete works by Jean-Jacques Rousseau, published by Pierre-Alexandre DuPeyrou and René Louis de Girardin (1780–1782).

Notes

References

Sources 

 
 
 
 
 

1759 births
1794 deaths
People from Nanterre
18th-century French politicians
French generals
French people executed by guillotine during the French Revolution
Hébertists